Rabbi Shmiel Dovid Halberstam, also known as the Sanz-Klausenberger Rebbe, is the younger son and one of the successors of Rabbi Yekusiel Yehudah Halberstam, the previous Klausenberger Rebbe. He resides in Brooklyn, New York.

Biography
He is one of seven children born in his father's second marriage to Chaya Nechama Ungar, daughter of the Nitra Rav, Rabbi Shmuel Dovid Ungar. He was named after his mother's father, who was murdered in the Holocaust. His older brother, Rabbi Zvi Elimelech Halberstam, is the Sanzer Rebbe of Israel, and he also has five sisters. He married Tzipora Weider, daughter of Rabbi Aharon Wieder, the Linzer Rav, who was a long-time dayan in the Klausenberger beis din (rabbinical court) in America.

Rabbi Halberstam is the leader of North American operations for the Mifal HaShas Torah study network founded by his father, and honoree president of the Kolel Chibas Yerushalayim charity organization in the name of Reb Meir Baal HaNess.

He is known for his effusive and lengthy prayers.

See also
Klausenberg (Hasidic dynasty)
Sanz (Hasidic dynasty)

References

External links
Sanz Klausenburg web-site, A collection of picture galleries of the rebbe and more.
Grand Rebbe Shmuel Halberstam officiating over the tish celebrating the Jewish holiday of Purim, video taken in his synagogue in the Boro Park section of Brooklyn, New York.

Rebbes of Sanz-Klausenberg
American Hasidic rabbis
Year of birth missing (living people)
Living people
People from Borough Park, Brooklyn